The 1984 Southern Illinois Salukis football team was an American football team that represented Southern Illinois University (now known as Southern Illinois University Carbondale) in the Missouri Valley Conference (MVC) during the 1984 NCAA Division I-AA football season.  Under first-year head coach Ray Dorr, the team compiled a 3–8 record (0–5 against conference opponents) and finished in last place out of seven teams in the MVC. The team played its home games at McAndrew Stadium in Carbondale, Illinois.

Schedule

References

Southern Illinois
Southern Illinois Salukis football seasons
Southern Illinois Salukis football